Colonel John Cameron of Fassiefern (1771–1815) of Fassiefern, Inverness-shire, was a celebrated Scottish military commander of the Napoleonic wars. He was a cousin of the Camerons of Lochiel. 

Cameron served as Colonel of the Gordon Highlanders and was killed in action at the Battle of Quatre-Bras. The Prince Regent created his father a baronet in 1817 in recognition of Cameron's distinguished military service.

Early life
John Cameron was born in Inverscadale by Loch Linnhe on 16 August 1771. He was one of six children of Sir Ewen Cameron, 1st Baronet, of Fassiefern in the parish of Kilmallie, and his first wife, Louisa (daughter of Duncan Campbell of Barcaldine and Glenure), Nursed by the wife of a family retainer whose son, Ewen McMillan, was his foster-brother and faithful attendant through life, young Cameron grew up in close sympathy with the traditions and associations of his home and people, who looked to his father as the representative head of the clan in the enforced absence of the chief of Lochiel. He received his schooling in part at Fort William Grammar School, but chiefly by private tuition, before going to King's College, Aberdeen. Cameron was then articled as a clerk in Edinburgh to James Fraser of Gorthleck, WS.

French Revolutionary Wars
After the outbreak of the French Revolutionary Wars, at his special request, a commission was obtained for Cameron, and he entered the army in May 1793 as Ensign in the 26th Cameronians, before being promoted as lieutenant in a newly-formed Highland Company, attached to the old 93rd Foot (Shirley's, disbanded after Demerara).

In the following year, George, Marquess of Huntly (later George, 5th Duke of Gordon), Captain 3rd Foot Guards, raised a corps of Highlanders at Aberdeen, which originally was numbered as the 100th Foot, but a few years later was redesignated as the now  92nd Gordon Highlanders. Cameron was appointed to command a company in this regiment on 24 June 1794, serving in Corsica and Gibraltar from 1795 to 1797 and in the south of Ireland in 1798. There he is said to have fallen in love with a young Irish woman in Kilkenny, but the match was broken off in submission to his father's wishes.

The next year, 1799 Cameron served in North Holland, where he was wounded in the fierce battle on the sand dunes between Bergen and Egmont-op-Zee on 2 October, one of the last few occasions when bayonets were used in action. He served as a captain in his regiment at the occupation of the Île-d'Houat off Brittany and at Cadiz in 1800 before fighting in Egypt, where he was wounded at the Battle of Alexandria, receiving the Ottoman Porte Gold Medal for the Egyptian Campaign.

Peninsular War
Cameron was promoted to major in the Cameron Highlanders in 1801, before appointment as lieutenant-colonel of a newly-formed second battalion (later disbanded) on 23 June 1808 which served mainly in Ireland.

Upon the return of 1st Battalion Cameron Highlanders from La Coruña, Cameron was transferred to its command and led the regiment in the Walcheren Campaign, subsequently proceeding to Portugal landing there on 8 October 1810. He and his troops distinguished themselves repeatedly during the succeeding campaigns, particularly at the Battle of Fuentes de Oñoro, 5 May 1811; at the Battle of Arroyo dos Molinos, 28 October 1811; at Battle of Almaraz, 19 May 1812; and at Battle of Vittoria, 21 June 1813, where his services appear to have been strangely overlooked in the award of honours; at the Passage of Maya, 13 July 1813; at the battles on the Nive between 9 and 13 December 1813; at the Passage of the Gave at Arriverette, 17 February 1814; and at the Capture of Acre (misprinted "Aire" in some accounts), 2 March 1814. Some particulars of the armorial and other honours bestowed upon  Cameron in recognition of his military service can be found in Cannon's Historical Record, 92nd Highlanders and in Burke's Peerage & Baronetage.

Waterloo Campaign and death at Quatre-Bras

During the Waterloo Campaign, Cameron's 92nd Foot alongside the 42nd Highlanders, 1st Royals, and 44th East Essex, formed General Pack's 9th Brigade of Sir Thomas Picton's 5th Division, and were among the first troops to march out of Brussels at daybreak on 16 June 1815. On that day, when leading his regiment in an attack on an enemy stronghold, on the road to Charleroi near the village of Quatre-Bras, Cameron was mortally wounded. He died the following morning and was buried there at the side of the road to Ghent road, during the great storm of the 17th by his foster-brother and faithful attendant, Private Ewen McMillan, (who had followed his fortunes from the first day he joined the Army), James Gordon, Regimental-Paymaster and a close personal friend, and a few soldiers of the regiment whose wounds prevented them engaging in combat on that day. At the request of his family, Cameron's remains were disinterred soon afterwards, brought home in a man-of-war and, in the presence of a gathering of three thousand highlanders from the then still populous district of Lochaber, were laid to rest in Kilmallie churchyard where an obelisk inscribed with a quotation by Sir Walter Scott marks the site of his grave.

Family baronetcy
In 1817 a baronetcy was created for Ewen Cameron of Fassiefern, as posthumous recognition of his late son's distinguished military service.

Sir Ewen Cameron died in 1828 at the age of ninety, when Cameron's younger brother succeeded as Sir Duncan Cameron, 2nd and last baronet. The Cameron baronetcy of Fassiefern became extinct in 1863.

Coat of arms

See also
 Cameron baronets
 Clan Cameron
 Highlanders (Seaforth, Gordons and Camerons)

Notes

References

 

 

 

Attribution
 lists as sources
Burke's Landed Gentry, Vol. i.;
Army Lists and War Office Muster-Rolls;
Cannon's Hist. Rec. 92nd Highlanders;
Napier's Hist. Peninsular War;
Siborne's Waterloo;
Clerk's Memoir of Colonel John Cameron, 2nd ed. (privately printed, Glasgow, 1858), 4to;
Gent. Mag. vol. xcix. pt. i. p. 87.

1771 births
1815 deaths
John
Deaths by firearm in Belgium
Alumni of the University of Aberdeen
Scottish soldiers
Recipients of the Army Gold Medal
Recipients of the Order of the Tower and Sword
British Army personnel of the French Revolutionary Wars
British Army personnel of the Napoleonic Wars
British Army personnel of the Peninsular War
Gordon Highlanders officers
Scottish military personnel killed in action
British military personnel killed in action in the Napoleonic Wars